Elaphria is a genus of moths of the family Noctuidae. The genus was erected by Jacob Hübner in 1818.

Species
 Elaphria acaste (Herrich-Schäffer, [1869])
 Elaphria agrotina (Guenée, 1852)
 Elaphria agyra (H. Druce, 1890)
 Elaphria alapallida Pogue & Sullivan, 2003
 Elaphria albiviata (Hampson, 1909)
 Elaphria algama (Schaus, 1904)
 Elaphria andersoni Schaus, 1940
 Elaphria antica (Walker, [1857])
 Elaphria aphronistes (Dyar, 1920)
 Elaphria apicalis (Schaus, 1898)
 Elaphria atrisecta (Hampson, 1909)
 Elaphria atrisigna (Hampson, 1909)
 Elaphria barbarossa (Hampson, 1909)
 Elaphria basistigma (Walker, 1858)
 Elaphria bastula (Schaus, 1906)
 Elaphria bertha (Schaus, 1898)
 Elaphria bogotana (Felder & Rogenhofer, 1874)
 Elaphria bucephalina (Mabille, 1885)
 Elaphria cadema (Schaus, 1898)
 Elaphria calopistrica (Hampson, 1909)
 Elaphria castrensis (Schaus, 1904)
 Elaphria cenicienta (Dognin, 1897)
 Elaphria chalcedonia (Hübner, [1808])
 Elaphria chionopsis (H. Druce, 1908)
 Elaphria chlorozona (E. D. Jones, 1908)
 Elaphria chulumaniensis (Köhler, 1968)
 Elaphria cognata (Schaus, 1911)
 Elaphria cohaerens (Schaus, 1911)
 Elaphria commacosta (Dyar, 1914)
 Elaphria conjugata (Moore, 1881)
 Elaphria convexa (Forbes, 1944)
 Elaphria cornutinus Saluke & Pogue, 2000
 Elaphria costagna (Schaus, 1904)
 Elaphria costipuncta (Schaus, 1904)
 Elaphria cyanympha (Ferguson, [1989])
 Elaphria delenifica (Schaus, 1911)
 Elaphria deliriosa (Walker, 1857)
 Elaphria deltoides (Möschler, 1880)
 Elaphria devara (H. Druce, 1898)
 Elaphria discisigna (Hampson, 1914)
 Elaphria ditrigona (E. D. Jones, 1908)
 Elaphria editha (Schaus, 1898)
 Elaphria encantada Hayes, 1975
 Elaphria exesa (Guenée, 1852)
 Elaphria festivoides (Guenée, 1852)
 Elaphria fissistigma (Hampson, 1898)
 Elaphria flaviorbis (Dognin, 1907)
 Elaphria fuscimacula (Grote, 1881)
 Elaphria georgei (Moore & Rawson, 1939)
 Elaphria goyensis (Hampson, 1918)
 Elaphria grata Hübner, 1818
 Elaphria guttula (Herrich-Schäffer, 1868)
 Elaphria haemassa (Hampson, 1909)
 Elaphria hemileuca (E. D. Jones, 1908)
 Elaphria hypophaea (Hampson, 1920)
 Elaphria hyposcota (Hampson, 1905)
 Elaphria insipida (Dognin, 1897)
 Elaphria interstriata (Hampson, 1909)
 Elaphria ipsidomo (Dyar, 1914)
 Elaphria isse (Schaus, 1914)
 Elaphria ixion (Schaus, 1914)
 Elaphria jalapensis (Schaus, 1894)
 Elaphria jonea (Schaus, 1906)
 Elaphria langia (H. Druce, 1890)
 Elaphria lentilinea (Hampson, 1909)
 Elaphria leucomela (Dognin, 1907)
 Elaphria leucostigma (H. Druce, 1908)
 Elaphria lithodia (Schaus, 1904)
 Elaphria lithotela (Dyar, 1914)
 Elaphria lucens (Schaus, 1911)
 Elaphria malaca (Schaus, 1902)
 Elaphria marmorata (Schaus, 1894)
 Elaphria mastera (Schaus, 1904)
 Elaphria medioclara (Schaus, 1911)
 Elaphria melanodonta (Dognin, 1914)
 Elaphria mesoleuca (Dognin, 1914)
 Elaphria mesomela (Dognin, 1907)
 Elaphria micromma (Dyar, 1914)
 Elaphria miochroa (E. D. Jones, 1908)
 Elaphria monyma (H. Druce, 1889)
 Elaphria niveopis (Dyar, 1912)
 Elaphria niveplaga (Schaus, 1898)
 Elaphria nucicolora (Guenée, 1852)
 Elaphria obliquirena (Hampson, 1909)
 Elaphria obscura (Schaus, 1906)
 Elaphria olivescens (Dogin, 1916)
 Elaphria optata (Schaus, 1911)
 Elaphria orbiculata (Schaus, 1898)
 Elaphria pallescens (Hampson, 1909)
 Elaphria perigeana (Schaus, 1911)
 Elaphria phaeopera (Hampson, 1909)
 Elaphria phaeoplaga (E. D. Jones, 1908)
 Elaphria phlegyas (Schaus, 1914)
 Elaphria plectilis (Guenée, 1852)
 Elaphria polysticta (E. D. Jones, 1908)
 Elaphria proleuca (Hampson, 1909)
 Elaphria promiscua (Möschler, 1890)
 Elaphria pulchra (H. Druce, 1889)
 Elaphria pulida (Dognin, 1897)
 Elaphria punctula (Schaus, 1906)
 Elaphria purpusi (Draudt, 1936)
 Elaphria renipes (Schaus, 1911)
 Elaphria repanda (Schaus, 1904)
 Elaphria rubripicta (Hampson, 1909)
 Elaphria rubrisecta (Hampson, 1909)
 Elaphria sanctanna (Guenée, 1852)
 Elaphria semirufa (H. Druce, 1908)
 Elaphria stelligera (Schaus, 1894)
 Elaphria stenelea (Schaus, 1904)
 Elaphria stenonephra (Hampson, 1909)
 Elaphria streptisema (Hampson, 1914)
 Elaphria stygiata (Hampson, 1909)
 Elaphria subobliqua (Walker, 1858)
 Elaphria subrubens (Guenée, 1852)
 Elaphria targa (Schaus, 1898)
 Elaphria tenebrosa (Dognin, 190)
 Elaphria tenuifascia (Hampson, 1918)
 Elaphria thionaris (Schaus, 1904)
 Elaphria thoracica (Schaus, 1898)
 Elaphria trifissa (Hampson, 1909)
 Elaphria venustula (Hübner, 1790) – rosy marbled
 Elaphria versicolor (Grote, 1875) – variegated midget
 Elaphria villicosta (Walker, 1858)
 Elaphria virescens (Schaus, 1904)
 Elaphria vittifera (Hampson, 1909)

Former species
 Elaphria ensina is now Bryolymnia ensina (Barnes, 1907)

References

Caradrinini